Zavarqan (also Romanized as Zavarqān; also known as Zavarbān) is a village in Salehan Rural District, in the Central District of Khomeyn County, Markazi Province, Iran. At the 2006 census, its population was 137, in 47 families.

References 

Populated places in Khomeyn County